Charles Gallogly (16 June 1919 – 12 January 1993) was an Irish professional footballer who played as a fullback for Huddersfield Town, Watford and Bournemouth & Boscombe Athletic.

In 1950 he was awarded two caps for Northern Ireland.  In 1958, he emigrated to the United States – for whom he'd won a single international cap in 1949 – and managed Brooklyn Shamrocks F.C. from 1958–61. He died in New York on 12 January 1993.

References

1919 births
1993 deaths
People from County Down
Association football defenders
Association footballers from Northern Ireland
Pre-1950 IFA international footballers
English Football League players
Glenavon F.C. players
Huddersfield Town A.F.C. players
Watford F.C. players
AFC Bournemouth players
Northern Ireland emigrants to the United States